Lucky Lamons (born February 3, 1960) is an American politician who served in the Oklahoma House of Representatives from the 66th district from 2002 to 2010.

References

1960 births
Living people
Democratic Party members of the Oklahoma House of Representatives